Maama Vaipulu (born 21 July 1989) is a New Zealand rugby player of Tongan descent. He represented Counties Manukau and the Chiefs in New Zealand and Tonga on an international level. Currently he plays in the number 8 and occasionally flanker position for the France based Top 14 side, Castres.

Career

Vaipulu started his professional career with the Counties Manukau Steelers during the 2012 ITM Cup, playing in the number eight position he immediately became a regular in the starting 15 and helped his side to become established in the ITM Cup Premiership.   
His physical play and explosiveness for the Steelers saw him named in the  squad for the 2015 Super Rugby season.

As of 2016 Vaipulu has been with Castres Olympique in France where they took out the French title in 2018 and representing Tonga's 'Ikale Tahi team in the 2019 Rugby World Cup in Japan where they finished 4th in their round after a win against USA.

Honours

Club 
 Castres
Top 14: 2017–18

References

External links
 

1989 births
Living people
New Zealand rugby union players
Rugby union flankers
Rugby union number eights
Counties Manukau rugby union players
Chiefs (rugby union) players
New Zealand sportspeople of Tongan descent
Castres Olympique players
New Zealand expatriate rugby union players
Expatriate rugby union players in France
New Zealand expatriate sportspeople in France
People educated at Pukekohe High School
People educated at Wesley College, Auckland
Tonga international rugby union players